Henry William Chesbrough (born 1956) is an American organizational theorist, adjunct professor and the faculty director of the Garwood Center for Corporate Innovation at the Haas School of Business at the University of California, Berkeley and Maire Tecnimont Chair of Open Innovation at Luiss. He is known for coining the term open innovation.

Biography 
Chesbrough holds a BA in Economics from Yale University, an MBA from Stanford Graduate School of Business, and a PhD from the Haas School of Business at the University of California, Berkeley.

He taught at the Harvard Business School as an assistant professor and Class of 1961 Fellow from 1997 to 2003. He is currently an adjunct professor and the faculty director of the Garwood Center for Corporate Innovation at the Haas School of Business at the University of California, Berkeley.

He acts as the chairman of the Open Innovation Center - Brazil. His first appearance in Brazil was in 2008, when he did a presentation in the Open Innovation Seminar 2008. He also acts as the chairman of board of advisors for Induct Software and appeared in Oslo on the 2011 Oslo Innovation Week

Publications

References

External links

 Henry Chesbrough at Haas School of Business
 

1956 births
Living people
American business theorists
Haas School of Business faculty
Haas School of Business alumni
Harvard Business School faculty
Stanford Graduate School of Business alumni
Yale College alumni